, also known as Bow Wow, is a Japanese manga series written and illustrated by . It was serialized in Shogakukan's seinen manga magazine Big Comic Superior from 1992 to 1999, with its chapters collected in 11 tankōbon volumes. A 40-episode anime television series adaptation by Nippon Animation was broadcast on TV Asahi from 1993 to 1994; a short film was also released in 1994.

Synopsis
The series follows Bow, a bull terrier that, starting out as a stray dog, lounges in with a struggling manga artist for a while before being adopted by Sayaka, a third grader and the daughter of a yakuza family. Initially the father is unwilling to take the dog in, especially as he is extremely accident-prone, but changes his mind after Bow saves the life of his gang's boss.

The rest of the story follows Bow's mishaps with Sayaka, her family (particularly her father, who shares an antagonistic relationship with him) and pets, along with the rest of the neighborhood.

Media

Manga
Shogakukan collected its chapters in 11 tankōbon volumes, released from March 30, 1993, to March 30, 2000.

Anime
A forty-episode anime television series (containing two segments each), titled , was broadcast on TV Asahi from October 14, 1993, to September 22, 1994.

A 22-minute film, titled  was released on August 20, 1994.

Video game
A video game developed by Takara, titled  was release for the Super Famicom on April 28, 1994.

References

External links
 

1994 Japanese television series endings
1994 video games
1990s animated short films
1994 comedy films
1994 films
Animated comedy films
Anime series based on manga
Anime short films
Animated films based on manga
Comedy anime and manga
Japanese comedy films
Manga adapted into films
Nippon Animation
Nippon Animation films
Seinen manga
Shogakukan manga
Super Nintendo Entertainment System games
Super Nintendo Entertainment System-only games
Takara video games
TV Asahi original programming
Video games based on anime and manga
Video games developed in Japan
Single-player video games